Kanha is a Hindi song from 2017 film Shubh Mangal Saavdhan. It was nominated at the 63rd Filmfare Awards for Best Playback Singer (Shashaa Tirupati). She lost to Meghna Mishra, but won in Screen Awards. The song was picked as one of the best Hindi songs of 2017 by an online portal. It is written and composed by Tanishk-Vayu.

Awards

References

Indian songs
Hindi-language songs
Hindi film songs